Morgan Edward Morgan (18 December 1913 – 16 April 1978) was a Welsh international prop who played club rugby for Swansea and international rugby for both Wales and the British Lions.

Rugby playing career
Morgan first played rugby for local club, Abercrave RFC, but by 1937 he had moved to first class team Swansea. While with Swansea, Morgan gained his first international cap for Wales when he was selected to face England as part of the 1938 Home Nations Championship. The previous tournament had been a terrible campaign for Wales, losing all three matches. The selectors reacted by bringing in four new caps into the pack, while retaining confidence in veteran backs. Morgan was brought in with Walter Vickery, Allan McCarley and Fred Morgan, which saw the pack transform the Welsh play, resulting in the first Welsh win over England in five years. Morgan was reselected for the rest of the tournament, which saw Wales losing narrowly away to Scotland, and a win over Ireland.

Morgan was later selected for the British Lions for their 1938 tour of South Africa, playing in 14 matches and gaining two caps in the first two tests. On his return he gained one final Welsh cap when he played against England in the opening game of the 1939 Home Nations Championship. Wales lost the game by a single try and Morgan did not represent Wales again.

International matches played
Wales
  1938, 1939
  1938
  1938

Bibliography

References

1913 births
1978 deaths
Abercrave RFC players
Barbarian F.C. players
British & Irish Lions rugby union players from Wales
Rugby union players from Pontardawe
Rugby union props
Swansea RFC players
Wales international rugby union players
Welsh rugby union players